Play the Best is the first greatest hits album by the Australian power pop group, Sunnyboys. It was released in July 1991 and peaked at number 75 on the ARIA Albums Chart.

Track listing

Charts

Release history

References

1991 greatest hits albums
Mushroom Records albums
Sunnyboys albums
Compilation albums by Australian artists